An art critic is a person who is specialized in analyzing, interpreting, and evaluating art. Their written critiques or reviews contribute to art criticism and they are published in newspapers, magazines, books, exhibition brochures, and catalogues and on websites. Some of today's art critics use art blogs and other online platforms in order to connect with a wider audience and expand debate about art.

Differently from art history, there is not an institutionalized training for art critics (with only few exceptions); art critics come from different backgrounds and they may or may not be university trained. Professional art critics are expected to have a keen eye for art and a thorough knowledge of art history. Typically the art critic views art at exhibitions, galleries, museums or artists' studios and they can be members of the International Association of Art Critics which has national sections. Very rarely art critics earn their living from writing criticism.

The opinions of art critics have the potential to stir debate on art-related topics. Due to this the viewpoints of art critics writing for art publications and newspapers adds to public discourse concerning art and culture. Art collectors and patrons often rely on the advice of such critics as a way to enhance their appreciation of the art they are viewing. Many now-famous and celebrated artists were not recognized by the art critics of their time, often because their art was in a style not yet understood or favored. Conversely, some critics, have become particularly important helping to explain and promote new art movements – Roger Fry with the Post-Impressionist movement, Lawrence Alloway with pop art as examples.

Controversies 

According to James Elkins there is a distinction between art criticism and art history based on institutional, contextual, and commercial criteria; the history of art criticism is taught in universities, but the practice of art criticism is excluded institutionally from academia. An experience-related article is Agnieszka Gratza. Always according to James Elkins in smaller and developing countries, newspaper art criticism normally serves as art history. James Elkins's perspective portraits his personal link to art history and art historians and in What happened to art criticism he furthermore highlights the gap between art historians and art critics by suggesting that the first rarely cite the second as a source and that the second miss an academic discipline to refer to.

Gallery

Notable art critics 

 Christopher Allen
 Lawrence Alloway
 Guillaume Apollinaire
 Zacharie Astruc
 Albert Aurier
 Charles Baudelaire
 Michael Baxandall
 Sister Wendy Beckett
 Clive Bell
 Andrew Berardini
 Bernard Berenson
 John Berger
 Vasily Botkin
 John Canaday
 Champfleury
 Kenneth Clark
 T. J. Clark
 Robert Coates
 Clarence Cook
 Douglas Cooper
 Royal Cortissoz
 Thomas Craven
 Arthur Danto
 G. Roger Denson
 Sergei Diaghilev
 Denis Diderot
 John Elderfield
 James Elkins
 Félix Fénéon
 Hal Foster
 Peter Frank
 Michael Fried
 B. H. Friedman
 Roger Fry
 Peter Fuller
 Théophile Gautier
 Stepan Gedeonov
 Gustave Geffroy
 Clement Greenberg
 Dmitry Grigorovich
 Boris Groys
 Ichirō Hariu
 Dave Hickey
 Robert Hughes
 Édouard Jaguer
 Michael Kimmelman
 
 Hilton Kramer
 Rosalind E. Krauss
 R. Siva Kumar
 Donald Kuspit
 Julien Leclercq
 Louis Leroy
 Lucy R. Lippard
 Giovanni Lista
 George Loukomski
 Sergey Makovsky
 Nancy Marmer
 Camille Mauclair
 Octave Mirbeau
 Robert C. Morgan
 Suzanne Muchnic
 John Neal
 Linda Nochlin
 Frank O'Hara
 Saul Ostrow
 Jed Perl
 Adrian Prakhov
 Griselda Pollock
 Nikolay Punin
 Arlene Raven
 Herbert Read
 Pierre Restany
 John Rewald
 Rainer Maria Rilke
 Daniel Robbins
 Barbara Rose
 Harold Rosenberg
 Robert Rosenblum
 John Ruskin
 John Russell
 Frank Rutter
 André Salmon
 Jerry Saltz
 Irving Sandler
 Meyer Schapiro
 Peter Schjeldahl
 Brian Sewell
 Roberta Smith
 Rafael Squirru
 Vladimir Stasov
 Leo Stein
 Leo Steinberg
 Aleksey Suvorin
 Michel Tapié
 Théophile Thoré-Bürger
 Éric Troncy
 Tristan Tzara
 Kirk Varnedoe
 Louis Vauxcelles
 Boris Vipper
 Karen Wilkin
 Émile Zola
 Ticio Escobar

See also
History of art criticism
List of art critics

References

External links

Good audio version of symposium on contemporary (2007) art criticism entitled "Empathy and Criticality," sponsored by the Frieze Foundation

 
critic